Corythoichthys nigripectus (black-breasted pipefish) is a species of marine fish of the family Syngnathidae. It is found in the Indo-Pacific, from the Red Sea, Indonesia and the Philippines to the Society Islands, Guam and New Caledonia. This species is both monogamous and ovoviviparous, with males carrying eggs and giving birth to live young.

References

nigripectus
Marine fish
Fish described in 1953
Fish of the Indian Ocean
Fish of the Pacific Ocean